Pouteria aristata is a species of plant in the family Sapotaceae. It is endemic to Cuba.

References

aristata
Endemic flora of Cuba
Taxonomy articles created by Polbot
Taxa named by Charles Baehni
Taxa named by Nathaniel Lord Britton
Taxa named by Percy Wilson